Johann Zarco (born 16 July 1990) is a French Grand Prix motorcycle racer, best known for winning the  and  Moto2 World Championships with his 2015 triumph being a record points total for the intermediate class. He rides for Pramac Racing.

With 16 Grand Prix victories across all classes and two Moto2 championships, Zarco is one of the most successful French riders in Grand Prix racing history.

Career

Early career
Born in Cannes, Zarco progressed up the motorcycling ladder and moved into minimoto championships in 2004, mainly based in Italy. In 2005, Zarco finished as runner-up in the Senior Mini European Championship and in 2006, he was runner-up in the European Open Championship. He also competed in the Italian 125cc championship, where he finished in twelfth place. Zarco took part in the Red Bull Rookies Cup in 2007, and won the championship at Estoril, after winning three races. He added a fourth win at the final race in Valencia. These performances enabled Zarco to become part of the Red Bull MotoGP Academy scheme along with Cameron Beaubier, Jonas Folger and Danny Kent. This reduced his racing in 2008, making a sporadic appearance in the Italian championship with Team Gabrielli.

125cc World Championship

WTR San Marino (2009–2010)
Zarco made his Grand Prix début with the WTR San Marino Team, in the season-opening Qatar Grand Prix. He finished the race in the points in 15th, although the rain-shortened race meant that Zarco gained just half a point. He took seven further points-scoring finishes, as he finished 20th in the championship. Zarco's best result of the season was a sixth-place finish at Mugello.

Zarco remained with WTR for the  season. Zarco started the season with a consistent run of points-scoring finishes, finishing each of the first eight races in the points. At the Czech Grand Prix, Zarco recorded the first fastest lap of his career, having pitted for slick tyres as the track's conditions became better for them to be run. He ultimately finished eleventh in the championship, despite retiring from the final three races.

Ajo Motorsport (2011)
For  he signed with Ajo Motorsport. At the second race, the Spanish Grand Prix, he gained his first podium finish by finishing third.

Moto2 World Championship

JiR Team (2012)
He finished the season 10th in the standings with 95 points and was easily the highest placed rookie that year.

Ioda Project Racing Team (2013)
In 2013, he moved to the Ioda Project Racing Team aboard a Suter, he improved on his rookie season by finishing on the podium twice and ended 9th on the standings with 141 points.

Caterham Moto Racing Team (2014)

For 2014, he joined the new Caterham Moto Racing team. He impressed on what many considered to be an inferior bike compared to the mainly dominant Kalex bikes. He managed to earn 4 podium finishes, as well as 1 pole position, earning him 6th in the standings with 146 points.

Ajo Motorsport (2015–2016)

In 2015, Zarco moved to the debuting Ajo Motorsport team, who he raced with in the 125cc class. Zarco dominated the field and won his first Moto2 title, with 8 wins, 14 podiums, 7 poles and a record points haul of 352. 

He remained with the team for 2016 and successfully defended his Moto2 title, becoming the first rider in the Moto2 era to win 2 intermediate titles, with 7 wins, 10 podiums, 7 poles and 276 points. Zarco became a popular figure with the fans with his spectacular backflip celebrations when he won a race. During the 2016 season, Zarco got his first taste of MotoGP machinery, testing the Suzuki GSX-RR with Suzuki Ecstar in a private test at track in Ruyo, Japan.

MotoGP World Championship

Team Suzuki Ecstar (testing 2016)
In 2016 Suzuki Team had a pre-contract with Zarco before the recruitment for 2017 was carried out. Zarco tested with Suzuki in a private test at the Suzuka Circuit, Japan. Unfortunately, Suzuki prefers Alex Rins to replace Aleix Espargaro. Meanwhile, for the other seats, Suzuki chose Andrea Iannone as a replacement for Maverick Vinales.

Monster Yamaha Tech3 (2017–2018)

2017 

For 2017, Zarco moved up to the premier class with the Tech3 Yamaha team. On his MotoGP debut at Qatar, Zarco shocked the grid by taking the lead on the first lap and building a 2-second lead, until he crashed out at turn 2 on lap 6. He scored his first MotoGP podium, a 2nd place, at Le Mans. He got his first pole position at Assen. In the race he touched with Rossi and dropped to 4th, and eventually finished in 14th place. Zarco again started from pole at the Japanese Grand Prix, but ultimately finished the race in 8th place. He achieved podium finishes in Sepang (Malaysia) and Valencia (Spain) where he finished in 3rd and 2nd respectively. He received the Rookie of the Year Award for 2017 and finished the season in 6th, the highest placed independent rider.

2018 
In 2018, Zarco started the season with a pole position in Qatar, before dropping to finish 8th. He finished 2nd in the Argentinian and Spanish Grands Prix, and achieved another pole position at his home French Grand Prix before crashing out of the race. In Malaysia he repeated his 3rd place podium finish from the previous year, and again finished 6th in the rider's championship standings.

Red Bull KTM Factory Racing (early 2019)
In early 2018 it was announced that Zarco would ride for the factory KTM team on a two-year contract from 2019. Following a difficult start to 2019 season where he struggled, managing barely to finish within the points-scoring positions, Zarco and KTM made the shock announcement at their home Austrian Grand Prix that they had reached a mutual agreement to end Zarco's contract prematurely at the end of the season. Despite initial intentions to complete the season with Zarco, KTM elected to release him unconditionally two races later after the Misano Grand Prix and replace him with test rider Mika Kallio for the remainder of the season, citing "lost hope" in the situation with Zarco's "negative attitude" before his impending departure.

LCR Honda (late 2019)
Zarco was offered a Honda for the last three races of the 2019 season due to regular rider Takaaki Nakagami electing to have surgery with an expected long recuperation period. He finished the first event in 13th place, and was knocked off by Joan Mir nearing the end of the second event when in 8th place. Zarco fell during his third race on the Honda when in 10th  position at Valencia, Spain, being hit when walking away by a following machine, without serious injury.

Avintia Esponsorama Racing (2020)
For the 2020 season, the Frenchman signed a one-year deal through Ducati to ride for Esponsorama Racing. During the Czech Grand Prix in Brno, Zarco took Esponsorama's first ever pole position, followed up with a podium finish in 3rd a day later. Consistently finishing within the points, Zarco ended the season in 13th position of the riders' standings.

Pramac Racing (2021–present)

2021 
Zarco signed a deal with Pramac Racing in September 2020 for the 2021 season. Zarco had a strong season in 2021 including career highs in podiums and the highest points total of any of his seasons in MotoGP. He ultimately finished fifth in the championship.

Career statistics

Red Bull MotoGP Rookies Cup

Races by year
(key) (Races in bold indicate pole position, races in italics indicate fastest lap)

Grand Prix motorcycle racing

By season

By class

Races by year
(key) (Races in bold indicate pole position, races in italics indicate fastest lap)

References

External links

 (in French)

125cc World Championship riders
French motorcycle racers
1990 births
Living people
Sportspeople from Cannes
Moto2 World Championship riders
Tech3 MotoGP riders
MotoGP World Championship riders
KTM Factory Racing MotoGP riders
LCR Team MotoGP riders
Avintia Racing MotoGP riders
Pramac Racing MotoGP riders
Esponsorama Racing MotoGP riders
Moto2 World Riders' Champions